Donald R. Cravins Jr. (born July 31, 1972), is an American attorney and politician serving as the under secretary of commerce for minority business development. He previously served as a member of the Louisiana State Legislature from 2004 to 2009. From April 2021 to August 2022, he was the executive vice president and COO of the National Urban League.

Early life and education 
Cravins was born in Houston and raised in St. Landry Parish, Louisiana. He earned a Bachelor of Arts degree in political science from Louisiana State University in 1994 and a Juris Doctor from the Southern University Law Center in 1998.

Career

Louisiana Legislature 
Cravins first sought elected office in 2004. On November 2, 2004, he was elected state representative for District 40 in a runoff election where he received 54% of the vote. When he was elected, he and his father, Don Cravins, Sr., made Louisiana history by becoming the first father and son duo to serve in the Louisiana Legislature at the same time. In 2006, Cravins' father resigned from the Louisiana State Senate to become mayor of Opelousas. Cravins Jr. ran unopposed to fill the unexpired term. In the October 20, 2007 election, Don Cravins Jr. was re-elected to the Louisiana State Senate and garnered 74 percent of the vote. He represented Senate District 24 from December 2006 until January 2009. During his tenure in the Senate, Cravins served as chair of the Insurance Committee, vice chair of the Retirement Committee and as an active member of the
Juvenile Justice Commission of Louisiana.

In 2006, Cravins was selected to serve as King Toussaint L'Ouverture, XLVIII by the Lafayette Mardi Gras Festival, Inc. in Lafayette, Louisiana.

2008 congressional campaign 
In the 2008 congressional elections, Cravins unsuccessfully ran as the Democratic candidate for Louisiana's 7th congressional district seat held by Republican U.S. Representative Charles Boustany. In addition to Boustany, Cravins faced Constitution Party candidate Peter Vidrine.

Later career 
In a letter dated January 4, 2009, Cravins announced his resignation as state senator to take a position as Staff Director and Chief Counsel of the U.S. Senate Committee on Small Business and Entrepreneurship. Cravins also served as chief of staff to United States Senator Mary Landrieu, a Democrat from New Orleans, from 2013 to 2015.

In 2015, Cravins was named the deputy national political director for the American Israel Public Affairs Committee. On July 7, 2015, he was named the National Urban League's senior vice president for policy and executive director of National Urban League Washington Bureau. In the roles, he was responsible for the Urban League Policy Institute, with primary responsibility for developing the League’s policy, research and advocacy agenda and expanding its impact and influence inside the beltway. He was also devoted to the League’s mission to empower communities through education and economic development.

In February 2019, Cravins left the National Urban League and became Vice President of Policy and External Affairs at Charter Communications, Inc.. There he was responsible for building partnerships with external stakeholders to further shared policy objectives. Charter Communications is America’s second largest cable operator in the United States and third largest pay TV operator. Cravins left Charter in May 2021 to rejoin the National Urban League as Executive Vice President and Chief Operating Officer.

In addition to his duties at the National Urban League, Cravins is an adjunct professor at George Washington University, where he teaches independent research in the College of Professional Studies.

In May 2022, Cravins was nominated by President Joe Biden to serve as the first Under Secretary of Commerce for Minority Business Development. In the role, Cravins will be responsible for leading the Minority Business Development Agency.

Military service 
He also serves as a major in the District of Columbia Army National Guard Judge Advocate General (JAG) Corps. He has received two Meritorious Service Medals, three Army Commendation Medals, an Air Force Commendation Medal and Army Achievement Medal for his military service.

Memberships and honors 
Cravins served on the board of the Energy Foundation and also served on the advisory board of Poder Latinx. He is a life member of Alpha Phi Alpha fraternity, a life member of The Rocks, Inc., a member of the Greater Washington Urban League Guild and the 100 Black Men of Prince George's County. His honors include being named 2020 Advocate of the year by the National Bar Association, being inducted into the Southern University Law School Hall of Fame in 2018 and being named a distinguished alumnus of Louisiana State University in 2015.

Personal life 
Cravins and his wife, Yvette Puckett Cravins, have three children and reside in Maryland.

See also
United States House of Representatives elections in Louisiana, 2008

References

1972 births
African-American state legislators in Louisiana
Democratic Party members of the Louisiana House of Representatives
United States Under Secretaries of Commerce
Biden administration personnel
Living people
Democratic Party Louisiana state senators
Politicians from Houston
People from Opelousas, Louisiana
People from Arnaudville, Louisiana
21st-century African-American people
20th-century African-American people